Vadim Leonidovich Yermolayev (born 14 February 1989) is a Russian professional ice hockey forward who currently plays for Beibarys Atyrau of the Kazakhstan Hockey Championship.

He previously played in the Russian Superleague and the Kontinental Hockey League for Metallurg Magnitogorsk and Barys Astana.

References

External links

1989 births
Living people
Arlan Kokshetau players
Barys Nur-Sultan players
Metallurg Magnitogorsk players
Molot-Prikamye Perm players
Nomad Astana players
People from Magnitogorsk
Russian ice hockey left wingers
Stalnye Lisy players
Sportspeople from Chelyabinsk Oblast
Yertis Pavlodar players